Passwang Pass (elevation ) is a high mountain pass in the Jura Mountains in the canton of Solothurn in Switzerland.

It connects the southern part of the canton of Solothurn via Mümliswil-Ramiswil (south of the pass) and Beinwil, Solothurn (northern side) with the so-called Schwarzbubenland (officially Amtei Dorneck-Thierstein, consisting of the canton of Solothurn districts Thierstein and Dorneck) north of the Passwang mountain chain, and ultimately with the Laufen District in the canton of Basel-Landschaft.

See also
List of highest paved roads in Europe
List of mountain passes
List of the highest Swiss passes

References

Swisstopo topographic maps

Mountain passes of Switzerland
Mountain passes of the Jura
Mountain passes of the canton of Solothurn